is a city located in the north of Miyazaki Prefecture, Japan. As of June 1, 2019, the city has an estimated population of 119,521 and a population density of 138 persons per km².

History
The city was officially founded on February 11, 1933, after it gained city status.  During World War II, it was one of the most important centers of military explosives in Japan.  On the night of June 28-29th, 1945, 117 United States B-29s fire-bombed the city, destroying 1.35 square km, or 36% of the city.  On July 16, 1945, 33 US B-24s bombed the bridges in around the city, severing the strategically important Nippō Main Line railway.

On February 20, 2006, Nobeoka absorbed the towns of Kitakata and Kitaura (both from Higashiusuki District).

On March 31, 2007, the town of Kitagawa (also from Higashiusuki District) was also merged into Nobeoka.

Geography

Climate
Nobeoka has a humid subtropical climate (Köppen climate classification Cfa), which is hot and humid in the summer (above ) and is somewhat cold in the winter with temperatures dropping to around freezing. Snowfall can be seen in the winter months, but does not accumulate because of coastal warming effects.

Surrounding municipalities
Miyazaki Prefecture

 Kadogawa
 Misato
 Hinokage

Ōita Prefecture

 Saiki

Demographics
Per Japanese census data, the population of Nobeoka in 2020 is 118,394 people. Nobeoka has been conducting censuses since 1920.

Economy
The city's economy depends strongly on the company Asahi Kasei, a producer of synthetic and industrial fibers. It is known regionally for its Ayu fish.

Transportation
Nobeoka is the terminal station for trains that run the length of the prefecture (although some trains do continue up into Ōita prefecture). It used to be the terminal station for the privately owned Takachiho line, which ran towards Kumamoto prefecture from the northeast to the northwest of the prefecture.  This line was closed after a typhoon in 2005, and has not been reopened.

Nobeoka is serviced by the Higashikyushu Expressway which brings transportation time to Miyazaki City down to one hour and travel time to Ōita City down to about 1 hour 30 minutes.

Nobeoka has its own municipal bus service with routes to most destinations in the city.

Tourism

Notable places
 Nobeoka Castle - A castle ruin, one of the Continued Top 100 Japanese Castles.

See also
Strategic bombing during World War II

References
 "Japs Disperse War Plants" , The Argus, Melbourne, June 30, 1945.

External links 
 Nobeoka City official website 
 Nobeoka City official website 

 
Cities in Miyazaki Prefecture